The Balai, Bhalse, Balahi or Bhalay are found in the states of Madhya Pradesh, Rajasthan, Delhi and Uttar Pradesh in India. Balai means weaver. The Bhalse are the upper group from the caste of Balai. Some Bhalse are still doing the work of weaving.

The Bhalses are bunkars and belong to the vaishya (Bania) caste. They are usually found in Madhya Pradesh, Rajasthan. They make and sell clothes and are attached with the work of weaving.

Acharya Shri Nanesh, the eighth Acharya of Sadhumargi Jain Shravak Sangha had preached among the Balai community in 1963 near Ratlam. His followers are called Dharmapal.  Many of them are followers of Lalgir, the venerable founder saint of a religious sect. They call themselves 'Alakhgirs' and a shrine of Sitala mata (smallpox goddess) can be found in their settlement. They observe nine day festival in her honour. They also pay tribute to Baba Ramdeo Ji.

According to 2011 Census of India, Uttar Pradesh showed the Balai population as 1200, whilst that in Rajasthan, there are 306,034 Balais constituting 9.11% of its total Scheduled Caste population and form the third largest group of the Dalits in state. In all of the states they are listed as Scheduled Caste. Despite occasional errors in the literature, they do not speak a distinct language. They speak the Nimadi language. There is no distinct Balai language, despite one being assigned an ISO [bhx].

References 

Weaving communities of South Asia
Scheduled Castes of Uttar Pradesh
Scheduled Castes of Rajasthan
Scheduled Castes of Madhya Pradesh
Scheduled Castes of Chhattisgarh
Scheduled Castes of Maharashtra